Irton with Santon is a civil parish in the Borough of Copeland, Cumbria, England.  It contains 17 listed buildings that are recorded in the National Heritage List for England.  Of these, two are listed at Grade II*, the middle of the three grades, and the others are at Grade II, the lowest grade.  The parish is in the Lake District National Park.  It contains the villages of Irton and Santon Bridge, and is otherwise rural.  In the parish is the country house of Irton Hall, which incorporates a medieval tower house, and also has a clock tower; all of these are listed.  The other listed buildings include houses, farmhouses, farm buildings, a church with a memorial in its churchyard, two bridges, a summer house, and an inn.


Key

Buildings

References

Citations

Sources

Lists of listed buildings in Cumbria